The 1950–51 Segunda División season was the 20th since its establishment and was played between 9 September 1950 and 6 May 1951.

Overview before the season
32 teams joined the league, including two relegated from the 1949–50 La Liga and 6 promoted from the 1949–50 Tercera División.

Relegated from La Liga
Gimnàstic
Oviedo

Promoted from Tercera División

Melilla
Logroñés
Las Palmas
Huesca
San Andrés
Ceuta

Group North

Teams

League table

Results

Top goalscorers

Top goalkeepers

Group South

Teams

League table

Results

Top goalscorers

Top goalkeepers

Promotion playoffs

League table

Results

Relegation playoffs

External links
BDFútbol

Segunda División seasons
2
Spain